Armi or ARMI may refer to:

 Armi (Syria), an ancient Syrian kingdom identified with Aleppo
 Fire (magazine), a Belgian-Francophone magazine that publish articles about firearms and militaria
 Armi Jager, an Italian firearms manufacturer
 Imperial Aramaic script, with ISO 15924 code Armi, 124
 Advanced Regenerative Manufacturing Institute, a Manufacturing USA research institute

People with the name
 Armi Aavikko, Finnish singer
 Armi Kuusela, Finnish model
 Armi Ratia, founder of Marimekko
 Armi Toivanen, Finnish actress
 Frank Armi, American race car driver